Hemant Kanoria is an Indian businessman.

He ran two family-owned flour mills in West Bengal. When the family exited the business, he started a financing company for the construction sector with his younger brother, Sunil Kanoria, which grew into Srei Infrastructure Finance Limited.

Through Srei, he started Sahaj e-village to establish a network of Common Service Centres to enable people in rural areas access government services.

By 2017 after accumulated losses, Srei was looking to divest its interests in Sahaj e-Village and other businesses. In October 2021, the Reserve Bank of India removed Kanoria from the boards of Srei finance companies, citing governance concerns and delays in interest payments for board supersession.

References

1962 births
Living people
Rajasthani people
Indian chairpersons of corporations
Chief executives in the finance industry